Maithuna (Devanagari: मैथुन) is a Sanskrit term for sexual intercourse within Tantric sex, or alternatively to the specific lack of sexual fluids generated, while mithuna is a couple participating in such a ritual. It is the most important of the five makara and constitutes the main part of the grand ritual of Tantra variously known as Panchamakara, Panchatattva, and Tattva Chakra. Maithuna means the union of opposing forces, underlining the nonduality between human and divine, as well as worldly enjoyment (kama) and spiritual liberation (moksha).

Mithuna is a popular icon in ancient Hindu art, portrayed as a couple engaged in physical loving.

History

Maithuna intercourse has been traditionally interpreted to be performed with semen retention by the male practitioner, although other authors consider it optional, possibly relegated only to late Tantra. Early maithuna might have consisted on generating sexual fluids (maithunam dravyam, or solely maithuna by metonymy) in order to be ritually ingested, in a similar way to the edible three first Panchamakara. The shedding of semen is also compared to water-offering (tarpana). This is related to similar practices like rajapana, the drinking of female discharge found in Kaula Tantra, and the mixing of all five ingredients into nectar (amrita) in the Jagannatha temple of Puri, as described by Frédérique Apffel-Marglin.

Late sources like Abhinavagupta in the tenth century warn that results of maithuna are not meant to be consumed like the rest of Panchamakara, calling those who do so "brutes" (pasus).

The 11th century Toḍala tantra places maithuna as the last of its pañcamakāra or "set of 5 M-words", namely madya (wine), māṃsa (meat), matsya (fish), mudrā (grain), and maithuna.

Around the 12th century, practices seemed to turn towards the absorption of sexual fluids into the body of the practitioner, like that of vajroli mudra.

Concept
Maithuna entails male-female couples and their union in the physical, sexual sense as synonymous with kriya nishpatti (mature cleansing). Just as neither spirit nor matter by itself is effective but both working together bring harmony so is maithuna effective only then when the union is consecrated. The couple become for the time being divine: she is Shakti and he is Shiva, and they confront ultimate reality and experiences bliss through union. The scriptures warn that unless this spiritual transformation occurs, the union is incomplete. However, some writers, sects and schools like Yogananda consider this to be a purely mental and symbolic act, without actual intercourse.

Yet it is possible to experience a form of maithuna not solely just through the physical union. The act can exist on a metaphysical plane with sexual energy penetration, in which the shakti and shakta transfer energy through their subtle bodies as well. It is when this transfer of energy occurs that the couple, incarnated as goddess and god via diminished egos, confronts ultimate reality and experiences bliss through sexual union of the subtle bodies.

References

Tantric practices
Hinduism and sexuality
Religious sex rituals